Darcy Brown (born May 29, 1986) is a former professional Canadian football fullback and tight end formerly of the Edmonton Eskimos of the Canadian Football League. He was drafted by the Hamilton Tiger-Cats in the first round of the 2009 CFL Draft. He played CIS football for the Saint Mary's Huskies.

Early years
Brown went to The Woodlands School, where he played varsity football for four years.

External links
Edmonton Eskimos bio
Hamilton Tiger-Cats bio

1986 births
Living people
Canadian football wide receivers
Edmonton Elks players
Hamilton Tiger-Cats players
Players of Canadian football from Ontario
Saint Mary's Huskies football players
Sportspeople from Mississauga